Frankie Howerd Strikes Again is a British comedy television series which originally aired on ITV in 1981. It was a sketch show produced by Yorkshire Television, in the style of Howerd's earlier series.

As well as Howerd, other performers who appeared in the series included Henry McGee, Neil Innes, Linda Cunningham, Jeanne Mockford, Norman Chappell, Claire Davenport, Ronnie Brody, Hilda Fenemore and Anneka Rice.

References

Bibliography
 Newcomb, Horace. Encyclopedia of Television. Routledge, 2014.

External links
 

1981 British television series debuts
1981 British television series endings
1980s British comedy television series
1980s British television sketch shows
ITV sketch shows
English-language television shows
Television series by Yorkshire Television